Bohemia Jazz Fest is an annual jazz festival in the Czech Republic.  It was started in 2005 by Czech-born jazz guitarist Rudy Linka. The festival travels to different historic squares in cities throughout the country during the month of July, beginning on Prague's Old Town Square, and ending in Budweis.  In the past, Bohemia Jazz Fest has visited Prachatice, Domazlice, Plzen, Tabor, and Brno.

Media 
Bohemia Jazz Fest is featured in Michelin's Prague 2012 guide.  It has also been featured in Downbeat magazine, as well as New York Times' blog "In Transit."

Performers 
Past performers include: 
 Larry Carlton
 Stanley Clarke
 Tom Harrell
 Roy Haynes
 Charles Lloyd
 John Patitucci
 Danilo Perez
 Chris Potter
 Terje Rypdal
 John Scofield
 Lonnie Smith
 McCoy Tyner
 Yellowjackets

References

Music festivals established in 2005
Jazz festivals in the Czech Republic
Summer events in the Czech Republic